Líber Ernesto Vespa Legarralde  (18 October 1971 – 25 July 2018) was an Uruguayan footballer who played for a number of clubs both in Argentina and Uruguay, including Argentinos Juniors, Rosario Central and C.A. Cerro.

He died on 25 July 2018 in Montevideo aged 46 after suffering an aneurysm.

Honours
Uruguay
 Copa América runner-up: 1999

References

External links
 Statistics at FutbolXXI.com  
 

1971 births
2018 deaths
Footballers from Montevideo
Uruguayan footballers
Uruguay under-20 international footballers
Uruguay international footballers
Uruguayan people of Italian descent
1997 FIFA Confederations Cup players
1999 Copa América players
C.A. Cerro players
Montevideo Wanderers F.C. players
Argentinos Juniors footballers
Rosario Central footballers
Arsenal de Sarandí footballers
Club Atlético Huracán footballers
Uruguayan Primera División players
Argentine Primera División players
Uruguayan expatriate footballers
Expatriate footballers in Argentina
Association football midfielders
Deaths from aneurysm
Montevideo City Torque managers